The 2003 Macau Grand Prix (formally the 50th Macau Grand Prix) was a motor race for Formula Three cars that was held on the streets of Macau on 16 November 2003. Unlike other races, such as the Masters of Formula 3, the 2003 Macau Grand Prix was not a part of any Formula Three championship, but was open to entries from all Formula Three championships. The race was divided into two legs: the first leg was held in the morning and lasted ten laps. The second took place in the afternoon and lasted fifteen laps. The overall winner was the driver who completed all 25 laps in the shortest amount of time. The 2003 event was the 50th running of the Macau Grand Prix and the 21st for Formula Three cars.

The Grand Prix was won by Signature Plus driver Nicolas Lapierre, having finished second in the first leg which was won by James Courtney of TOM'S. Lapierre took the lead four laps from the end when Courtney sustained a puncture running over carbon fibre debris and crashed into the wall at the Melco hairpin. Lapierre became the first rookie to win in Macau since David Coulthard in 1991. Second place went to the other Signature Plus car driven by Fábio Carbone and third was Prema Powerteam's Katsuyuki Hiranaka.

Background and entry list
The Macau Grand Prix is a Formula Three race considered to be a stepping stone to higher motor racing categories such as Formula One and has been termed the territory's most prestigious international sporting event. The 2003 Macau Grand Prix was the fiftieth running of the event and the twenty-first time the race was held to Formula Three regulations. It took place on the  22-turn Guia Circuit on 16 November 2003 with three preceding days of practice and qualifying.

In order to compete in Macau, drivers had to compete in a Fédération Internationale de l'Automobile (FIA)-regulated championship race during the calendar year, in either the Formula Three Euro Series or one of the domestic championships, with the highest-placed drivers given priority in receiving an invitation to the race. Within the 30 car grid for Macau, three of the four major Formula Three series were represented by their respective champions. Ryan Briscoe, the Formula Three Euro Series champion, was joined in Macau by All-Japan Formula Three series winner James Courtney and Italian champion Fausto Ippoliti. The highest ranked driver representing the British Formula Three Championship was Nelson Piquet Jr. and he was joined by the series' scholarship champion E. J. Viso. Five drivers from outside of Formula Three received invitations from race organisers to enter the race. They were Lewis Hamilton, the Formula Renault 2.0 UK champion, who was entered as a result of his improved performances at the British series round at Brands Hatch, World Series by Nissan driver Narain Karthikeyan and Macau natives Lei Kit Meng, Michael Ho and Jo Merszei.

Practice and qualifying
There were two one-hour practice sessions preceding the race on Sunday: one on Thursday morning and one on Friday morning. Courtney, a pre-race favourite, lapped fastest early in the first practice session at 2 minutes, 14.724 seconds. He was 0.744 seconds quicker than Pierre Kaffer in second. Richard Antinucci, Tatsuya Kataoka, Karthikeyan, Fábio Carbone, Briscoe, Katsuyuki Hiranaka, Robert Kubica and Paolo Montin made up positions three through ten. Three incidents occurred during the session. Hamilton collided with Kataoka at Fisherman's Bend corner and spun into a barrier. Marco Bonanomi hit a wall at Dona Maria Bend corner and Fairuz Fauzy braked too late for Lisboa turn and struck the barrier.

Qualifying was divided into two 45-minute sessions; the first was held on Thursday afternoon, and the second on Friday afternoon. The fastest time set by each driver from either session counted towards their final starting position for the race on Sunday. The start of the first qualifying session was delayed by 35 minutes due to an incident during practice for the Porsche Carrera Cup Asia race in which an unknown driver dented an Armco barrier at the exit of the pit lane and course officials had to repair it. When the session did start in overcast but warm weather, several drivers occupied provisional pole position, until Courtney avoided using new tyres to set a 2 minutes, 13.232 seconds lap and go quickest. Carbone was six-tenths of a second behind in second having held pole position for much of the session. Kaffer was consistently in the top four and was provisional third. Kataoka took fourth and Robert Doornbos fifth. Nicolas Lapierre corrected a ride height problem that slowed him in practice and was sixth after running strongly throughout. Lapierre was ahead of Montin and Piquet. Karthikeyan and César Campaniço were ninth and tenth. Antinucci was the fastest driver not to enter the top ten; he was as high as provisional pole position early on. Following Antinucci were Nico Rosberg, Álvaro Parente and Hiranaka. Briscoe was an early pace setter; he could not replicate this form later on and was 15th.  The rest of the order was completed by Fauzy, Pedro Barral, Andrew Thompson, Hamilton, Ronnie Quintarelli. Danny Watts, Viso, Naoki Yokomizo, Bonanomi, Ho, Rob Austin, Hiroki Yoshimoto, Kubica, Lei and Merszei. The session was disrupted with two red flags as some drivers ventured off the track. Viso spun on the approach to Police Bend and rested sideways on a narrow section of the track. Kubica was close by and tried to avoid Viso but hit the wall and ricocheted off his nose cone. The circuit became impassible as a result, and the session was stopped to allow officials to move the stricken cars. The second stoppage came after Barral spun entering the Melco hairpin and blocked the track. Yellow flags were later needed at the R-Bend turn after Piquet removed his left-rear wheel striking the wall.

In the second half an hour practice session, Courtne posted a lap time of 2 minutes, 13.566 seconds to go fastest, three-tenths of a second ahead of Antinucci. Kataoka, Lapierre, Doornbos, Montin, Rosberg, Kaffer, Yoshimoto and Carbone placed third through tenth. The first stoppage of the session happened when Austin had an accident and Yokomizo crashed heavily at San Francisco Bend corner. Other drivers to sustain car damage were Piquet, Barral, Briscoe and Hiranaka.

The start of the second qualifying session was delayed for 25 minutes due to multiple incidents and crashes in second practice and qualifying for the Porsche Carrera Cup Asia race. When it did start, most drivers saved two sets of tyres for Sunday's race but nobody improved their laps early on. Although heavy traffic stopped Courtney from improving his time, he continued to hold pole position until Carbone took it with a time of 2 minutes, 13.016 seconds late on. However, Carbone's session ended early spinning into the wall at San Francisco Bend corner trying to improve his time. Briscoe pushed hard and joined Carbone on the grid's front row despite replacing a wishbone on his suspension after spinning into a barrier at Fisherman's Bend early on. Courtney fell to third, attributing this to a gear ratio change that slowed him. Lapierre improved to fourth while Kaffer fell to fifth. Antinucci also improved his best time and gained five places to qualify sixth despite going off at Lisboa turn. Rosberg clipped the wall at Police bend but set a seventh-place lap. Kataoka was eighth and Montin ninth. Doornbos had an accident at Lisboa corner and fell five places to tenth. Behind him, the rest of the field lined up as Parente, Fauzy, Piquet, Kubica, Campaniço, Watts, Karthikeyan, Hamilton, Yoshimoto, Quintarelli, Thompson, Barral, Hiranaka, Viso, Austin, Ho, Yokomizo, Bonanomi, Lei and Merszei. As other drivers went off the track, one other major incident occurred during the session: the unwell Karthiekyan could not control his car and pulled off at Police bend.

Qualifying classification
Each of the driver's fastest lap times from the two qualifying sessions are denoted in bold.

Warm-up
A twenty-minute warm-up session was held on the morning of the race. Antinucci drove faster than in all the prior sessions and led with a lap of 2 minutes, 14.048 seconds. Carbone was a tenth of a second behind in second and Piquet followed close behind in third. Placing fourth was Kataoka with Doornbos fifth and Kaffer sixth. Briscoe, Montin, Rosberg and Kubica rounded the session's top ten fastest drivers. After warm-up, but before the first leg of the race, the field was reduced to 29 cars as Karthikeyan was withdrawn due to him being diagnosed with glandular fever by the FIA medical delegate.

Race
Sunday's race was divided into two aggregate legs lasting a total of 30 laps. The first 15-lap leg was held in the morning and the results of that leg determined the starting order of the second with the winner starting from pole position. Afterwards, a five-hour interval was observed to allow for the intervening support races to occur. The second 15-lap leg took place later in the afternoon. The overall winner of the Grand Prix was the driver who won the second leg provided they had completed all 30 laps in the shortest possible time.

Leg 1

The first leg of the race began under overcast but dry weather at 09:15 Macau Standard Time (UTC+08:00) on 16 November. On the formation lap, one of Piquet's tyres shredded up into Moorish Hill. It then detached and Piquet shattered his front wing. Piquet stopped in the pit lane and ran to the grid to seek a mechanic from his team; repairs could not be completed before the start. Briscoe made a brisk start to draw alongside pole sitter Carbone on the inside into Reservoir Bend corner. Briscoe took the lead after touching wheels with Carbone. However, Briscoe kept the lead for a short while as he carried excess speed approaching Lisboa turn and ran wide, allowing Carbone back through. Lapierre and Courtney used the situation to claim second and third from Briscoe. Further down the order, Kaffer tried to pass Montin on the inside but hit a barrier on the outside. As Kaffer ricocheted across the track, Rosberg rolled over one of the stricken vehicles and rested upside down on the circuit. Parente also got caught up in the incident and retired. Watts then sustained front wing damage but returned to the pit lane for a replacement nose cone before retiring a lap later.

Because of the wreckage, the safety car was deployed to allow a crane to remove all the stricken cars. The safety car remained on the circuit until the start of the third lap. Lapierre immediately challenged his teammate Carbone, which caused Carbone's right-side front wing endplate to break and launch into the air. Lapierre consequently took the lead new leader by passing Carbone into Lisboa corner and Courtney followed suit. Carbone then fell behind Briscoe who moved to fourth and Antinucci challenged him. In the meantime, Austin moved to 13th after starting 25th. Upfront, Lapierre withstood pressure from Courtney and responded by setting what was at that point the race's fastest lap, a circuit of 2 minutes and 15.704 seconds on the fifth lap. Courtney was not disconcerted by Lapierre and overtook him on the outside at Lisboa corner for the lead on lap six. Meanwhile, Kataoka passed Doornbos and Hamilton overtook Kubica.

Katoka and Hamilton gained another position on lap seven when a frustrated Briscoe collided with Carbone in an attempt to pass for third due to Carbone braking  earlier at Lisboa corner and spun. Carbone continued but Briscoe was stuck in Lisboa turn's escape road where he was trying to restart his car and Antinucci moved into third. Kataoka was now duelling Carbone but an error in traffic trying to overtake Carbone into Lisboa turn forced him to abandon the duel and driving onto the escape road to avoid hitting Carbone. Katoka was now pressured by Hamilton who overtook Doornbos on lap nine but re-passed him at Lisboa corner on the final lap before Doornbos' drive shaft broke and relinquished positions. Courtney extended his advantage to win by 4.6 seconds and began the second leg from pole position. He was joined on the grid's front row by Lapierre. The last of the finishers were Antinucci, Carbone, Hamilton, Kubica, Fauzy, Thompson, Quintarelli, Hiranaka, Austin, Viso, Yoshimoto, Doornbos, Briscoe, Ho, Bonanomi, Lei, Merszei and Barral. Other retirements included Campaniço, Kataoka and Piquet who damaged their cars through collisions with the wall.

Leg 2
The race's second leg started later that day at 15:55 local time in cloudy weather and on a dry track. Yoshimoto removed his front wing and it was replaced before the second leg began. Courtney held the lead going into Reservoir Bend corner with Lapierre close by. Hamilton moved to third but could not advance any further as he was caught up in a multi-car accident. Hamilton was slow leaving the turn, causing him to run wide, and Kubica challenged him on the inside approaching San Francisco Bend. Kubica crashed into a tyre wall and ricocheted into the incoming field. Antnucci then drifted into a wall and his front wing broke Hamilton's front track rod following a minor collision with the latter's right-rear tyre. Antinucci's teammate Thompson also went into a barrier. The incidents necessitated the safety car's deployment for two laps as track marshals were required to remove the wrecked cars. Courtney remained first at the restart, followed by Lapierre and fended off a series of initial attacks from him for the lead. Under the safety car, Hamilton noticed he had a punctured tyre from the contact with Antinucci. He allowed Carbone through just before the start/finish line to make the puncture known to race officials; he retired in the pit lane at the end of lap three. Meanwhile, Viso retired on the lap with car damage caused by debris.

Lapierre was underneath the rear of Courtney's car entering the Melco hairpin each time; Courtney pulled out a small advantage on the circuit's straights because his engine was more powerful than Lapierre's. This proved so until Lapierre drew closer to Courtney by setting the race's fastest lap and Courtney responded by doing the same lap after lap. It gave Courtney a small lead to negate the slipstream effect that Lapierre would have had if he was close by. In the meantime, Carbone incurred a drive-through penalty for a pass on Hamilton before the start/finish line. It was rescinded when race officials realised Hamilton's puncture prevented Carbone from backing out of the manoeuvre. Carbone responded by lapping faster than the top two but Lapierre reacted almost immediately and again began to draw closer to Courtney. Lapierre was soon close enough to attempt an overtake entering Lisboa turn but Courtney blocked him.

Further back, an oil leak forced Parente to retire in the pit lane on lap seven. Meanwhile, Austin lost part of his front wing and led a group of cars that included Rosberg who sought a way past but Piquet was close by. Piquet then stopped attacking, allowing Rosberg to focus on Austin. He drew alongside Austin only for him to come back before the latter made a pit stop for a new front wing. At the front, Courtney focused on increasing his lead by recording the weekend's fastest lap of 2 minutes, 12.937 seconds on the tenth lap, and it appeared he would win the race comfortably. However, on lap 11, Courtney was two seconds ahead of Lapierre when stray carbon fibre debris lying on the circuit from an earlier incident punctured his right-rear tyre. That rendered Courtney unable to steer and he crashed against a barrier leaving the Melco hairpin. Courtney's front-right suspension was torn from his car and damaged the bodywork. Although Courtney was unhurt, Lapierre took the lead.

Kaffer was hassling Kataoka for sixth but this became fifth when Doornbos' gearbox failed on lap 14. Doornbos' retirement promoted Hiranaka to third as Kaffer overtook Kataoka for fifth. On the final lap, Kataoka retired due to a crash into a wall alongside the circuit. On his maiden appearance in Macau, it was Lapierre's overall victory, completing the second leg in a time of 37 minutes, 0.078 seconds, and achieving the first win for a rookie in Macau since David Coulthard in the 1991 edition. Lapierre was 5.416 seconds ahead of his teammate Carbone in second and Hiranaka completed the outright podium in third. Off the podium, Quintarelli had a quiet race in fourth and Briscoe finished fifth. Yoshimoto was sixth, Ho seventh, Austin eighth, Fauzy ninth and Barral tenth. The Macanese duo of Lei and Merszei were 11th and 12th. Bonanomi, Piquet, Kataoka and Doornbos were the last of the overall classified finishers after Lapierre lapped them. Of the 29 drivers, nine completed all 25 laps of the event.

Race classification

References

External links
 

Macau Grand Prix
2003 in Formula Three
Grand
Macau